Høje Gladsaxe is a large housing project, approximately 10 km northwest of central Copenhagen, Denmark. The project contains five 15-storey blocks, two 8-storey blocks and some smaller blocks. It contains around 2,500 apartments. The project was finished in 1966.

Notable people 
 Anis Basim Moujahid (born 1992), stage name Basim, a Danish pop singer and songwriter;  of Moroccan origin, but lives in Høje Gladsaxe,

External links
 Høje Gladsaxe website

Housing estates in Copenhagen
Buildings and structures completed in 1966
Geography of Copenhagen
Gladsaxe Municipality